Voltage-dependent L-type calcium channel subunit beta-4 is a protein that in humans is encoded by the CACNB4 gene.

Function 

This gene encodes a member of the beta subunit family, a protein in the voltage-dependent calcium channel complex. Calcium channels mediate the influx of calcium ions into the cell upon membrane polarization and consist of a complex of alpha-1, alpha-2/delta, beta, and gamma subunits in a 1:1:1:1 ratio. Various versions of each of these subunits exist, either expressed from similar genes or the result of alternative splicing. The protein described in this record plays an important role in calcium channel function by modulating G protein inhibition, increasing peak calcium current, controlling the alpha-1 subunit membrane targeting and shifting the voltage dependence of activation and inactivation. Alternate transcriptional splice variants of this gene, encoding different isoforms, have been characterized.

Clinical significance 

Certain mutations in this gene have been associated with idiopathic generalized epilepsy (IGE) and juvenile myoclonic epilepsy (JME).

Interactions 

CACNB4 has been shown to interact with Cav2.1.

See also
 Voltage-dependent calcium channel

References

Further reading

External links
 
 
 

Ion channels